Adam Adami may refer to:

 Adam Adami (diplomat) (died 1663), German diplomat and priest
 Adam Adami (footballer) (born 1992), Brazilian footballer who plays for Tre Fiori